Lower Mickletown is a hamlet in the City of Leeds, in the English county of West Yorkshire. It was named Low Mickletown in the early 20th century and has been known under this name at least until about 1950.

Lower Mickletown is served by Arriva Yorkshire buses running between Leeds and Wakefield.


Location grid

References 

West Yorkshire A-Z

Further reading
 

Villages in West Yorkshire
Rothwell, West Yorkshire